Events from the year 1733 in art.

Events
 March – William Hogarth sketches Sarah Malcolm, convicted of murder, in her condemned cell in London; from this he immediately publishes an engraving and makes a painting.

Works

 William Hoare of Bath – Portrait of Ayuba Suleiman Diallo
 Sebastiano Ricci
 Baldassarre and Ester before Ahasuerus (Quirinal Palace, Rome)
 Pope Gregory the Great intercedes for souls in Purgatory (St-Gervais-et-St-Protais, Paris)
 Pope Pius V, Saints Thomas Acquinus and Peter Martyr (Gesuati, Venice)
 Saint Francisco resuscitates the child Paola (San Rocco, Venice)
 Saint Helen discovers the True Cross (San Rocco, Venice)

Births
 January 8 – Anton von Maron, Austrian painter active in Rome (died 1808)
 January 18 – Samuel Hieronymus Grimm, Swiss watercolour painter (died 1794)
 March 13 – Johann Zoffany, German neoclassical painter (died 1810)
 March 23 – Josiah Spode, English potter (died 1797)
 May – Franz Edmund Weirotter, Austrian landscape painter (died 1771)
 May 21 – Johanna Juliana Friederike Bacciarelli, German painter (died 1809 or later)
 May 22 – Hubert Robert, French painter (died 1808)
 June 12
 Alessandro Longhi, Venetian portrait painter and printmaker in etching (died 1813)
 Maruyama Ōkyo, Japanese painter (died 1795)
 October 5 – Louis Jean-Jacques Durameau, French painter and winner of the Grand prix de Rome (died 1796)
 October 30 – Sawrey Gilpin, English painter of animals (died 1807)
 date unknown
 Jean-Baptiste Claudot, French painter of landscapes, flowers and still-life (died 1805)
 Luo Ping, Chinese Qing dynasty painter, one of the Eight Eccentrics of Yangzhou (died 1799)
 Franciszek Pinck, Polish sculptor and stucco artist (died 1798)
 Anna Brita Sergel, textile artist of the royal Swedish court (died 1819)

Deaths
 January 18 – Simon Gribelin, French line engraver (born 1661)
 February 28 – Ignaz Waibl,  Austrian woodcarver (born 1661)
 April 15 - Englebert Fisen, Flemish painter (born 1655)
 May 1 – Nicolas Coustou, French sculptor (born 1658)
 May 8 – Bernard Picart, French engraver (born 1673)
 July – Jan van Huchtenburg, Dutch painter (born 1647)
 August 24 – Pierre-Étienne Monnot, French sculptor (born 1657)
 November 2 – Louis de Boullogne, French painter and brother of Bon Boullogne (born 1657)
 December 2 – Gerard Hoet, Dutch Golden Age painter (born 1648)
 date unknown
 Nicolas Fouché, French painter (born 1653)
 Alexis Grimou, French painter (born 1678)
 Gaetano Martoriello, Italian painter of marine vedute and landscapes (born 1680)
 Giacomo Parolini, Italian painter of altarpieces (born 1663)
 Giovanni Stefano Robatto, Italian painter of churches in Genoa (born 1649)
 Thomas van der Wilt, Dutch painter (born 1659)

 
Years of the 18th century in art
1730s in art